Marysville School is a historic school building located near Pacolet, Spartanburg County, South Carolina. It built in 1915 by the Pacolet Manufacturing Company to serve the African-American community of Marystown. It is a 1 1/2-story, three room school building in an "L" shape. The school closed in 1954.

It was listed on the National Register of Historic Places in 2007.

References

African-American history of South Carolina
School buildings on the National Register of Historic Places in South Carolina
School buildings completed in 1915
Buildings and structures in Spartanburg County, South Carolina
National Register of Historic Places in Spartanburg County, South Carolina
1915 establishments in South Carolina